Communauté d'agglomération CAP Excellence is a communauté d'agglomération, an intercommunal structure in the Guadeloupe overseas department and region of France. Created in 2008, its seat is in Pointe-à-Pitre. Its area is 129.9 km2. Its population was 99,532 in 2019.

Composition
The communauté d'agglomération consists of the following 3 communes:
Les Abymes
Baie-Mahault
Pointe-à-Pitre

References

CAP Excellence
CAP Excellence